Michaela Laki (Greek:Μιχαέλα Λάκη; born 24 March 2005) is a Greek professional tennis player.

Laki has won one singles title and three doubles titles on the ITF Circuit. Her career-high singles ranking of world No. 665, she reached on 3 October 2022.

Playing for Greece Fed Cup team, Laki has a win–loss record of 1–2.

Junior career
Junior Grand Slam results - Singles:
 Australian Open: QF (2022)
 French Open: 3R (2021)
 Wimbledon: 1R (2021, 2022)
 US Open: 3R (2021)

Junior Grand Slam results - Doubles:
 Australian Open: 2R (2022)
 French Open: 2R (2021)
 Wimbledon: 1R (2021)
 US Open: 2R (2021)

ITF Circuit finals

Singles: 3 (1 title, 2 runner-ups)

Doubles: 5 (3 titles, 2 runner-ups)

ITF Junior finals

Singles: 7 (6 titles, 1 runner-up)

Doubles: 5 (4 titles, 1 runner-ups)

References

External links
 
 

Living people
2005 births
Greek female tennis players
Sportspeople from Larissa